DreamHammer is a San Diego-based software company that provides advanced drone management software for enterprise customers.

History

Its first product, Ballista, is an OS for drones and allows one person to simultaneously control multiple drones of any type. It features a plug and play architecture that can be integrated into any unmanned system. Ballista has been licensed to government agencies including the U.S. Navy's Program Executive Office (PEO) Unmanned Aviation and Strike Weapons.

On July 3, 2013, DreamHammer announced it was partnering with Lockheed Martin to use the company's software for integrated command and control of Lockheed Martin's unmanned aerial vehicles.
Lockheed and the Pentagon have worked with DreamHammer to create the software which works with boats, planes or trucks.
DreamHammer has spent $6.5 million to develop the software.

References

External links
 DreamHammer site
 "Drones in the USA: The Battle for the Civilian Market". MainStreet
 "Pentagon Recruiting Software Developers for Drone ‘App Store’". National Defense
 "DreamHammer goes Ballista for multi-vehicle control software". Unmanned Daily News
 "DroneOS: How To Take Control Of The Country's Growing Robot Army". Forbes
 "Why Amazon's Going Up in the Air". Businessweek
 "Windows for drones? One start-up is dreaming big". CNBC

Companies based in Santa Monica, California
American companies established in 2000
Software companies based in California
Software companies of the United States